Cherry Bomb is the third extended play by NCT 127, the Seoul-based sub-unit of the South Korean boy band NCT. It was released by SM Entertainment on June 14, 2017, and distributed by Genie Music. The EP includes a total of seven tracks.

The EP was a commercial success, peaking at number two on the Gaon Album Chart. It has sold over 127,642 physical copies as of December 2017.

Background and release
On May 25, SM Entertainment confirmed NCT 127's comeback in June and stated that the group filmed the music video for their comeback in Gyeonggi Province.

On June 5, at midnight (KST), NCT 127's first teaser image of their comeback was released. The image features what appears to be an explosion of cherries. On the same day, the agency revealed that the EP is titled "Cherry Bomb" and is set to be released on June 14 at 18:00 (KST).

From June 7 to June 9, teaser images of individual members were released. A group image was released on June 10. The group also released cartoon characters video on their official Instagram page, also special message from the members. Subsequently, teaser clips was unveiled. The track-list was unveiled on June 11, along with a special clip of "Cherry Bomb". The EP was released on June 14. The music video for "Cherry Bomb" achieved more than three million views in 24 hours. The album's illustrations were drawn by Bang Sang-ho.

Single
"Cherry Bomb" was released as the title track in conjunction with the EP on June 14. It was produced by Dem Jointz, Deez and Yoo Young-jin. The single was described as a hip hop with a "complex synth and bass-infused" track with colorful compositions that meet the members' unique rap, vocals and powerful performance. The song also samples the lyrics from the popular American children's song "If You're Happy and You Know It". The choreography of "Cherry Bomb" is by Tony Testa who choreographed NCT 127's previous single  "Fire Truck". The song's "Performance Version", which has an added future bass section, is an alternate version of the song used in the group's performances as well as in the music video.

The song entered at number 37 on the Gaon Digital Chart on the chart issue dated June 11–17, 2017, with 39,006 downloads sold.

Promotions
"Cherry Bomb" was deemed "unfit for broadcast" by KBS due to mentions of violence in their lyrics, gory descriptions, and more, thus the group did not perform the song on Music Bank, instead, they performed their B-side "O'Mile".

NCT 127 kickstarted their promotions with a showcase, held on June 14. There were no entrance fees charged for the showcase, as it marked the group's first showcase since its debut.
The group promoted on South Korean music shows starting from June 15 where they performed "Cherry Bomb" and "0 Mile" on M Countdown.

Commercial performance
Cherry Bomb'''s pre-orders reached 101,444 copies, exceeding NCT 127's previous EPs NCT #127 and Limitless.Cherry Bomb debuted at number two on the Gaon Album Chart and Billboard's US World Albums, debuted at number 21 on Billboard's Top Heatseekers Albums, and number 22 on the Oricon Albums Chart. The EP entered at number two on the Gaon Album Chart for the month of June 2017, with 105,877 physical copies sold.

Critical receptionFuse TV introduced NCT 127's "Cherry Bomb" describing it as edgy and explosive, and described the song as the most sophisticated track by the group so far. The lead single, "Cherry Bomb" was chosen by Billboard and Idolator'' as one of the best K-pop songs of 2017.

Track listing

Charts

Sales

Accolades

Music program awards

Release history

References

External links
 "Cherry Bomb" music video

2017 EPs
SM Entertainment EPs
Korean-language EPs
Hip hop EPs
Dance-pop EPs
Genie Music EPs
NCT 127 albums